28th Street station could refer to:
 28th Street (IRT Broadway – Seventh Avenue Line)
 28th Street (IRT Lexington Avenue Line)
 28th Street (BMT Broadway Line)